The Polish Arts Club of Chicago is a 501(c)(3) not-for-profit established in 1926. The club's first art exhibition was held in 1933.

Advocacy and outreach
The club's advocacy and outreach work has included collaborating with several other arts and culture organizations in both the United States and Poland.

The Polish Arts Club of Chicago is the oldest affiliated organization of the American Council for Polish Culture, which was founded in 1948 in Detroit as the American Council of Polish Cultural Clubs. It currently represents the interests of some thirty-five to forty affiliated organizations located in the United States.

References

External links 
 
 Congressman Frank Annunzio, Chester Majewski, Ted Lechowicz at the Polish Arts Club of Chicago
 Polish Arts Club Exhibition Program

Arts organizations based in Illinois
Non-profit organizations based in Chicago
Polish diaspora in North America
Organizations established in 1926
Polish-American culture in Chicago
Artist groups and collectives based in Chicago
History of Chicago